Rickling may refer to the following places:

Rickling, Essex, England, including Rickling Green
Rickling, Germany, a municipality in the district of Segeberg, in Schleswig-Holstein, Germany.
Rickling (Amt)